Balranald may refer to:

Places

Scotland
 Balranald, a bay and estate in North Uist, Outer Hebrides, Scotland, once the seat of the MacDonalds of Griminis
 Balranald Nature Reserve, an RSPB reserve on the north west coast of North Uist, Outer Hebrides, Scotland

Australia
 Balranald, a town and local government area in the Riverina district of New South Wales, named after the estate in North Uist, Outer Hebrides, Scotland
 Balranald Shire, a local government area in the Riverina area of western New South Wales
 Electoral district of Balranald, an NSW electoral district for the state assembly
 Balranald Bridge, over the Murrumbidgee River on the Sturt Highway at Balranald, NSW
 Balranald railway line, a Victorian Railways broad gauge line, now closed, that ran to Balranald, New South Wales
 Balranald Airport, a small airport located northeast of Balranald, New South Wales

Other uses
 Balranald Football Club, an Australian football club competing in the Central Murray Football League.  The club is based in the town of Balranald, New South Wales

See also

 
 Ranald (disambiguation)
 Bal (disambiguation)